Ike is a mostly masculine given name and nickname, often short for English names Isaac, Isaiah, and Isidore. It may refer to:

People

Arts and entertainment
 Ike Amadi (born 1979), Nigerian-American voice actor
 Ike Barinholtz (born 1977), American actor, comedian, voice actor and screenwriter
 Ike Cole (1927–2001), American jazz pianist and composer, brother of Nat King Cole
 Ike Isaacs (guitarist) (1919–1996), Burmese-British jazz guitarist
 Ike Isaacs (bassist) (1923–1981), American jazz bassist
 Ike Moriz (born 1972), German-South African  singer, songwriter and actor
 Ike Quebec (1918–1963), American jazz tenor saxophonist
 Ike Turner (1931–2007), American musician, bandleader, talent scout and record producer
 Ike Willis (born 1955), American vocalist and guitarist
 Ike Nwala (born 1986), American actor and comedian based in Tokyo, Japan

Politics and the military
 Ike Franklin Andrews (1925-2010), American politician
 Dwight D. Eisenhower (1890-1969), Supreme Commander of the Allied forces in Europe during World War II and President of the United States
 Ike Ekweremadu (born 1962), Nigerian politician and lawyer
 Ike Leggett (born 1944), American politician
 John Isaac Moore (1856-1937), American politician
 Ike Nwachukwu (born 1940), Nigerian politician and retired army officer
 Ike Skelton (1931-2013), American politician
 Ike Thompson (1915–1995), American politician

Sports
 Ike Anigbogu (born 1998), American basketball player
 Ike Armstrong (1895-1983), American football player, coach of football, basketball and track, and college athletics administrator
 Isaac Austin (born 1969), American retired National Basketball Association player
 Ike Bartle, English professional rugby league footballer who played in the 1890s and 1900s
 Ike Boettger (born 1994), American football player
 Ike Charlton (born 1977), former National Football League and Canadian Football League player
 Ike Clarke (1915–2002), English football player and manager
 Ike Davis (born 1987), American Major League Baseball player
 Ike Delock (1929-2022), American baseball player
 Ike Diogu (born 1983), Nigerian-American professional basketball player
 Ike Eichrodt (1903-1965), American Major League Baseball player
 Ike Forte (born 1954), American former National Football League player
 Ike Frankian (1905–1963), American National Football League player
 Ike Harris (born 1952), American former National Football League player
 Ike Hilliard (born 1976), American former National Football League player
 Ike Ibenegbu (born 1986), Nigerian footballer
 Ike Iroegbu (born 1995), American-born Nigerian basketball player for Hapoel Galil Elyon of the Israeli Basketball Premier League
 Ike Kelley (born 1944), American former National Football League player
 Ike Mahoney (1901–1961), American National Football League player
 Ike Nwankwo (born 1973), Nigerian-American basketball player
 Ike Ofoegbu (born 1984), American-Nigerian Israeli Premier Basketball League player
 Ike Opara (born 1989), American Major League Soccer player
 Ike Petersen (1909–1995), American National Football League player
 Ike Poole (1915–2002), American college basketball player
 Ike Rogers, American college football player
 Ike Quartey (born 1969), Ghanaian former boxer and WBA welterweight world champion
 Ike Samuels (1874–1964), American Major League Baseball player 
 Ike Sewell (1903–1990), American college football player and entrepreneur
 Ike Shorunmu (born 1967), Nigerian former football goalkeeper
 Ike Taylor (born 1980), American retired National Football League player
 Ike Tomlinson (1910-2000), American college baseball, basketball and football coach and athletics administrator
 Ike Williams (1923-1994), American boxer and NBA lightweight world champion
 Ike Woods (1879–1962), Australian rules footballer

Other
 Ike Clanton (1847–1887), Old West outlaw present (unarmed) at the Gunfight at the O.K. Corral
 Isaac Haxton (born 1985), American professional poker player
 Ike Pappas (1933-2008), longtime CBS News correspondent

Fictional characters
Ike (Fire Emblem), the main character in the video games Fire Emblem: Path of Radiance and Fire Emblem: Radiant Dawn, and a playable fighter in Super Smash Bros. Brawl, Super Smash Bros. for Wii U/3DS, and Super Smash Bros. Ultimate.
 Ike Broflovski, a recurring character in the animated television series South Park
 Ike Skidmore, in the musical Oklahoma!
 Ike, a nickname for the main probe (Isaac Newton) from the mockumentary Alien Planet
 Ike, the horse in the 2006 film Charlotte's Web
 Ike Boone, recurring character in John Grisham's junior novels.
 Ike, a fuzzy character from the game Quantum Conundrum
 Ike Godsey, a recurring character played by Joe Conley in the television series The Waltons
 Ike Evans, the main character of the television series Magic City
 Ike Graham, the main character in the 1999 film Runaway Bride

See also
 Ike (disambiguation)
 Reverend Ike, African-American minister and television evangelist Frederick J. Eikerenkoetter II (1935-2009)
 Cliff Edwards (1895-1971), American singer and voice actor known as "Ukulele Ike"
 Tropical Storm Ike, a list of tropical cyclones that were assigned the name Ike
 Hurricane Ike (2008), a powerful category 4 major hurricane from the 2008 Atlantic hurricane season

Lists of people by nickname
Hypocorisms
English masculine given names